ABSS may refer to:

 Alamance-Burlington School System, a school district
 Administration of the Property of the Holy See, or Amministrazione dei Beni della Santa Sede in Italian
 Agent-based social simulation, in social science
 Automated Boxing Scoring System, an electronic computer-based scoring system for amateur boxing